A Tier 1 network is an Internet Protocol (IP) network that can reach every other network on the Internet solely via settlement-free interconnection (also known as settlement-free peering). Tier 1 networks can exchange traffic with other Tier 1 networks without paying any fees for the exchange of traffic in either direction. In contrast, some Tier 2 networks and all Tier 3 networks must pay to transmit traffic on other networks.
There is no authority that defines tiers of networks participating in the Internet. The most common and well-accepted definition of a Tier 1 network is a network that can reach every other network on the Internet without purchasing IP transit or paying for peering. By this definition, a Tier 1 network must be a transit-free network (purchases no transit) that peers for free with every other Tier 1 network and can reach all major networks on the Internet. Not all transit-free networks are Tier 1 networks, as it is possible to become transit-free by paying for peering, and it is also possible to be transit-free without being able to reach all major networks on the Internet.

The most widely quoted source for identifying Tier 1 networks is published by Renesys Corporation, but the base information to prove the claim is publicly accessible from many locations, such as the RIPE RIS database, the Oregon Route Views servers, Packet Clearing House, and others.

It can be difficult to determine whether a network is paying for peering or transit, as these business agreements are rarely public information, or are covered under a non-disclosure agreement. The Internet peering community is roughly the set of peering coordinators present at the Internet exchange points on more than one continent. The subset representing Tier 1 networks is collectively understood in a loose sense, but not published as such.

Common definitions of Tier 2 and Tier 3 networks:
 Tier 2 network: A network that peers for free with some networks, but still purchases IP transit or pays for peering to reach at least some portion of the Internet.
 Tier 3 network: A network that solely purchases transit/peering from other networks to participate in the Internet.

History
The original Internet backbone was the ARPANET when it provided the routing between most participating networks. The development of the British JANET (1984) and U.S. NSFNET (1985) infrastructure programs to serve their nations' higher education communities, regardless of discipline, resulted in 1989 with the NSFNet backbone. The Internet could be defined as the collection of all networks connected and able to interchange Internet Protocol datagrams with this backbone. Such was the weight of the NSFNET program and its funding ($200 million from 1986 to 1995)—and the quality of the protocols themselves—that by 1990 when the ARPANET itself was finally decommissioned, TCP/IP had supplanted or marginalized most other wide-area computer network protocols worldwide.

When the Internet was opened to the commercial markets, multiple for-profit Internet backbone and access providers emerged. The network routing architecture then became decentralized and attained a need for exterior routing protocols, in particular the Border Gateway Protocol emerged. New Tier 1 ISPs and their peering agreements supplanted the government-sponsored NSFNet, a program that was officially terminated on April 30, 1995. The NSFnet-supplied regional networks then sought to buy national-scale Internet connectivity from these now numerous, private, long-haul networks.

Routing through peering
A bilateral private peering agreement typically involves a direct physical link between two partners. Traffic from one network to the other is then primarily routed through that direct link.

A Tier 1 network may have various such links to other Tier 1 networks. Peering is founded on the principle of equality of traffic between the partners and as such disagreements may arise between partners in which usually one of the partners unilaterally disconnects the link in order to force the other into a payment scheme. Such disruptive de-peering has happened several times during the first decade of the 21st century. When this involves large-scale networks involving many millions of customers this may effectively partition a part of the Internet involving those carriers, especially if they decide to disallow routing through alternate routes. This is not largely a technical issue but a commercial matter in which a financial dispute is fought out using the other party's customers as hostages to obtain a better negotiating position. In the worst case, single-homed customers of each network will not be able to reach the other network at all. The de-peering party then hopes that the other network's customers will be hurt more by the decision than its own customers which may eventually conclude the negotiations in its favor. Lower tier ISPs and other parties not involved in the dispute may be unaffected by such a partition as there exist typically multiple routes onto the same network. The disputes referenced have also typically involved transit-free peering in which one player only exchanged data with the other that involved each other's networks—there was no data transiting through the other's network destined for other parts of the Internet. By the strict definition of peering and the strict definition of a Tier 1 network, a Tier 1 network only peers with other Tier 1 networks and has no transit routes going anywhere. More practically speaking, Tier 1 networks serve as transit networks for lower tier networks and only peer with other Tier 1 networks that offer the same services on an adequate scale—effectively being "peers" in the truest sense of the word.

More appropriately then, peering means the exchange of an equitable and fair amount of data-miles between two networks, agreements of which do not preclude any pay-for-transit contracts to exist between the very same parties. On the subject of routing, settlement-free peering involves conditions disallowing the abuse of the other's network by sending it traffic not destined for that network (i.e. intended for transit). Transit agreements however would typically cater for just such outbound packets. Tier 1 providers are more central to the Internet backbone and would only purchase transit from other Tier 1 providers, while selling transit to providers of all tiers. Given their huge networks, Tier 1 providers do not participate in public Internet Exchanges but rather sell transit services to such participants.

In the most logical definition, a Tier 1 provider will never pay for transit because the set of all Tier 1 providers sells transit to all of the lower tier providers everywhere, and becauseAs such, by the peering agreement, all the customers of any Tier 1 provider already have access to all the customers of all the other Tier 1 providers without the Tier 1 provider itself having to pay transit costs to the other networks. Effectively, the actual transit costs incurred by provider A on behalf of provider B are logically identical to the transit costs incurred by provider B on behalf of provider A—hence there not being any payment required.

List of Tier 1 networks
These networks are universally recognized as Tier 1 networks, because they can reach the entire internet (IPv4 and IPv6) via settlement-free peering. The CAIDA AS rank is a rank of importance on the internet.

While most of these Tier 1 providers offer global coverage (based on the published network map on their respective public websites), there are some which are restricted geographically. However these do offer global coverage for mobiles and IP-VPN type services which are unrelated to being a Tier 1 provider.

A 2008 report shows Internet traffic relying less on U.S. networks than previously.

Regional Tier 1 networks

A common point of contention regarding Tier 1 networks is the concept of a regional Tier 1 network. A regional Tier 1 network is a network which is not transit free globally, but which maintains many of the classic behaviors and motivations of a Tier 1 network within a specific region.

A typical scenario for this characteristic involves a network that was the incumbent telecommunications company in a specific country or region, usually tied to some level of government-supported monopoly. Within their specific countries or regions of origin, these networks maintain peering policies which mimic those of Tier 1 networks (such as lack of openness to new peering relationships and having existing peering with every other major network in that region). However, this network may then extend to another country, region, or continent outside of its core region of operations, where it may purchase transit or peer openly like a Tier 2 network.

A commonly cited example of these behaviors involves the incumbent carriers within Australia, who will not peer with new networks in Australia under any circumstances, but who will extend their networks to the United States and peer openly with many networks. Less extreme examples of much less restrictive peering requirements being set for regions in which a network peers, but does not sell services or have a significant market share, are relatively common among many networks, not just regional Tier 1 networks.

While the classification regional Tier 1 holds some merit for understanding the peering motivations of such a network within different regions, these networks do not meet the requirements of a true global Tier 1 because they are not transit free globally.

Other major networks
This is a list of networks that are often considered and close to the status of Tier 1, because they can reach the majority (50%+) of the internet via settlement free peering with their global rings. However, routes to one or more Tier 1 are missing or paid. Therefore, they are technically Tier 2, though practically something in between.

See also
 Interconnect agreement
 Internet exchange point
 List of Internet exchange points

References

Internet architecture